The 1990 Oklahoma gubernatorial election was held on November 6, 1990 to elect the governor of Oklahoma. Democratic businessman David Walters won the election easily despite his lack of political experience.

Democratic primary

Results

Republican Primary

Results

General Election

References

1990
Gubernatorial
Okla